Riccardo Salvino (born  29 March 1944) is an Italian film and television actor.

Born in Palermo, Salvino made his film debut at 23 years old, with a main role in Franco De Rosis' Il magnaccio. In the 1970s he was very active in genre films, often in main roles. In the 1980s he focused his activities on television, appearing in a number of series and TV-movies of some success.

Partial filmography 

 Il magnaccio (1969) - Sergio Venturi
 Probabilità zero (1969) - Hans Liedholm
 Rangers: attacco ora X (1970) - Lieutenant Porter
 A Sword for Brando (1970) - Robin Hood
 La lunga spiaggia fredda (1971) - Jonathan
 The Legend of Frenchie King (1971) - Jean (uncredited)
 Winged Devils (1972) - Lt. Gianni Orlando
 Your Vice Is a Locked Room and Only I Have the Key (1972) - Dario
 Partirono preti, tornarono… curati (1973) - John the Timid
 Un modo di essere donna (1973) - Fabrizio
 Madeleine, anatomia di un incubo (1974) - Luis
 Swept Away (1974) - Signor Pavone Lanzetti
 Death Will Have Your Eyes (1974) - Stefano
 Colt 38 Special Squad (1976) - Nicola Silvestri
 The Probability Factor (1976) - Robert
 Nick the Sting (1976) - Mark
 Emanuelle in America (1977) - Bill
 Camouflage (1977) - Italian
 Ladies' Doctor (1977) - Filippo
 Stunt Squad (1977) - Agent Brogi
 The Assisi Underground (1985) - Otto Maionica
 The Belt (1989) - Professor Achille Biondelli

References

External links 
 

1944 births
Italian male film actors
Italian male television actors
Male actors from Palermo
20th-century Italian male actors
Living people